Richard Conniff (born March 2, 1951) is an American non-fiction writer, specializing in human and animal behavior.

Career
Conniff also writes about wildlife, human cultures and other topics for Time, Smithsonian, Atlantic Monthly, The New York Times Magazine, National Geographic, Audubon Magazine, Yale Environment 360, Scientific American and other publications in the United States and abroad. His magazine work in Smithsonian won the 1997 National Magazine Award, and was included in The Best American Science and Nature Writing in 2000, 2002, and 2006. Conniff is also the winner of the 2001 John Burroughs Award for Outstanding Nature Essay of the Year, a 2007 Guggenheim Fellowship, and a 2009 Loeb Journalism Award.

Conniff has been a frequent commentator on NPR and has served as a contributing opinion writer for The New York Times online. He has written and presented television shows for National Geographic Channel, TBS, Animal Planet, the BBC, and Channel Four in the UK. His television work has been nominated for an Emmy Award for distinguished achievement in writing, and he won the 1998 Wildscreen Prize for Best Natural History Television Script for the BBC show Between Pacific Tides.

Honors and awards
 1997 National Magazine Award
 Best American Science and Nature Writing (2000, 2002, and 2006)
 2001 John Burroughs Award for Outstanding Nature Essay of the Year
 2007 Guggenheim Fellowship
 2009 Gerald Loeb Award for Online business journalism for "Middle Class Crunch"
 2012 Alicia Patterson Journalism Fellow
 2020 Alfred P. Sloan Foundation grant

Writing

Books
Ending Epidemics: A History of Escape from Contagion.  MIT Press. 2023. ISBN  9780262047968.
House of Lost Worlds: Dinosaurs, Dynasties, and the Story of Life on Earth. Yale University Press. 2016. .

 
 
 
 Rats!: the good, the bad, and the ugly, Crown Publishers, 2002, 
 Every Creeping Thing: True Trales of Faintly Repulsive Wildlife, (Henry Holt, 1998) 
 Spineless Wonders: Strange Tales from the Invertebrate World (Henry Holt, 1996)

Selected magazine articles
 TIME: Head Man in the Boneyard (1990)
 TIME: Water Marketing A Deal That Might Save A Sierra (1989)
 The Atlantic: Darwin's Revenge (2008)
 The Atlantic: Heart of Darwin (2008)
  New York Times: Abolish All 'Taxes' (op-ed, 2008)
 The World Before Vaccines is a World We Can’t Afford to Forget (2019)
 Why Putting Solar Canopies on Parking Lots Is a Smart Green Move (2021)
 The Unsung Heroes Who Ended a Deadly Plague (2022)

References

External links
 Richard Conniff's Strange Behaviors Blog
 Richard Conniff's Species Seekers Blog
 "Richard Conniff: Author of The Natural History of the Rich talks with Robert Birnbaum", identity theory, November 5, 2002
 New York Times article on The Natural History of the Rich

American columnists
American essayists
American male essayists
Living people
Gerald Loeb Award winners for News Service, Online, and Blogging
1951 births
American nature writers
American male non-fiction writers